Henry Ling Roth (3 February 1855 – 12 May 1925) was an English-born anthropologist and museum curator, active in Australia.

Early life
Roth was born in London, the son of Dr Mathias Roth, an Austrian-born surgeon, and his English wife Anna Maria, née Collins. Henry was educated at University College School, London, and studied natural science and philosophy in Germany. At 20 years of age, Roth visited British Guiana. In the spring of 1876 Roth visited Russia and remained there until December 1877. Shortly afterwards his Notes on the Agriculture and Peasantry of Eastern Russia was published at London.

Career
In 1878 Roth went to Australia (preceding his brothers Reuter Emerich Roth and Walter Edmund Roth) commissioned to investigate the Queensland sugar industry by English investors. Roth settled at Mackay in northern Queensland, and published A Report on the Sugar Industry in Queensland (1880). Papers on "The Climate of Mackay" and "On the Roots of the Sugar Cane" appeared in the Journal and Proceedings of the Royal Society of New South Wales in 1881 and 1883. He had an article in The Brisbane Courier for 1 April 1884, subsequently returned to England, and in 1888 was established in business at Halifax, West Yorkshire. In 1890 he published The Aborigines of Tasmania, a careful and able gathering together of the available information relating to a vanished race. A second edition appeared in 1899. In 1896 Roth brought out another important book, The Natives of Sarawak and British North Borneo (published by Truslove and Hanson), largely based on the manuscript of Hugh Brooke Low. He spent much time in a wide range of ethnological studies and many of his papers were published in scientific journals.

In June 1900 Roth was appointed honorary curator of the Bankfield Museum, Halifax, Yorkshire, then in a very run-down condition. Roth soon improved the museum, and in 1912 was appointed half-time keeper and later on he worked full-time on the museum. Roth published Great Benin; Its Customs, Art and Horrors (1903), and  The Yorkshire Coiners, 1767-1783 (1906), and Notes on Old and Prehistoric Halifax (1906). That Roth still retained his interest in Australia is indicated by his book on The Discovery and Settlement of Port Mackay, Queensland, which was published in 1908. Roth's Oriental Silverwork, Malay and Chinese, appeared in 1910 (again with Truslove and Hanson). Around this time he began publishing a long series of Bankfield Museum notes, of which 23 numbers eventually appeared. In 1916 Sketches and Reminiscences from Queensland, Russia and Elsewhere, was privately printed. His health was not robust and in August 1924 he resigned from the museum, but continued to help in its work when his health permitted. Roth died on 12 May 1925 and was survived by his wife (Nancy Harriette, née Haigh) and two sons.

Legacy
Roth was a modest man, his work in anthropology was very largely based on the fieldwork of other men, but he had a talent for collating information and records, and his volumes on the Tasmanian aborigines and the natives of Sarawak and North Borneo were standard books. Roth's work has not been fully appreciated; a list of his publications will be found in Man for July 1925. 
Henry Ling Roth's collection of books was acquired by the library of the University of Manchester in 1917.

References

Gorman, A.C.  2008  The primitive body and colonial administration: Henry Ling Roth's approach to body modification. In Russell McDougall and Iain Davidson (eds)  The Roth Family:  Anthropology and Colonial Administration, pp 93–103,  Left Coast Press, Walnut Creek CA

External links
 
 
 Henry Ling Roth Papers at the John Rylands Library, Manchester.

1855 births
1925 deaths
English anthropologists
People educated at University College School